Ferruccio Manza (born 26 April 1943) is a retired Italian road cyclist. Competing as amateur in the 100 km team time trial, he won an Olympics silver medal and a world title in 1964. He then had a brief career as a professional, which ended around 1967.

References

1943 births
Living people
Italian male cyclists
Olympic silver medalists for Italy
Cyclists at the 1964 Summer Olympics
Olympic cyclists of Italy
Olympic medalists in cycling
Cyclists from Brescia
Medalists at the 1964 Summer Olympics
UCI Road World Champions (elite men)